Abdolvahed Mousavi Lari  (born 1954) is an Iranian Shia cleric and reformist politician. He was the interior minister during the presidency of Mohammad Khatami.

Early life
Mousavi Lari was born in Mohr, Fars in 1954.

Career
In August 1997, when Mohammad Khatami was elected  president of Iran, Lari was appointed vice president for legal and parliamentary affairs. However, following the impeachment of Abdollah Nouri by the Parliament, he was nominated by Khatami as minister of interior and the Parliament voted to him. He was in office until 2005 when Mahmoud Ahmadinejad became president and nominated Mostafa Pour-Mohammadi as interior minister.

Lari is a leading member of the Association of Combatant Clerics party.

References

1954 births
Living people
Interior Ministers of Iran
People from Fars Province
Association of Combatant Clerics politicians
Members of the Reformists' Supreme Council for Policymaking
Vice Presidents of Iran for Legal and Parliamentary Affairs